

Lincoln V-12 Timeline
1902 Henry M. Leland establishes the Cadillac Automobile Company
1909 Cadillac purchased by General Motors
1914 Cadillac introduces V-8, sells 13,000 in first year
1917 Leland establishes Lincoln Motor Company, immediately receives contract to build V-12 Liberty aviation engines
1917 Lincoln produces first automobile, the V-8 powered luxury Model L
1922 Lincoln sells only 150 cars
1922 Ford Motor Company acquires Lincoln
1923 Lincoln sales rise 45% 
1930 Lincoln phases out L series; introduces K-Series powered by 384 cubic inch (6.3 L) 60° V-8 producing 125 hp
1931 Cadillac introduces V-12 road car for $800 less than V-8 Lincoln
1932 Ford introduces 221 cubic inch (3.6 L) 90° Flathead V-8 producing 65 hp
1932 Lincoln introduces 447.9 cubic inch (7.3 L) 65° L-head V-12 producing 150 hp (112 kW); K-Series product line split into KA-Series (V-8 powered) and KB-Series (V-12 powered)
1933 Lincoln introduces 381.7 cubic inch (6.3 L) 67° L-head V-12 producing 125 hp to replace 384 cubic inch (6.3 L) 60° V-8; all Lincolns now V-12 powered.
1934 Lincoln uprates the smaller of its two V-12's from 381.7 cubic inches (6.3 L) to 414 cubic inches (6.8 L), making the same 150 hp as the older, heavier, and more expensive 447.9 cubic inch (7.3 L) V-12; Lincoln fits the engine to both KA (now denoting short wheelbase) and KB (long-wheelbase) models
1935 Lincoln product lines rationalised to a single Model K
1936 Model K limousine is Lincoln's best-seller
1936 Upon introduction the Lincoln-Zephyr range of lower-priced, midsized luxury cars is powered by the new 110 hp Lincoln-Zephyr H Series V-12, a 267 cubic inch (4.4 L) 75° engine based on the Flathead Ford V-8
1948 Lincoln-Zephyr V-12s are phased out, replaced with the InVincible 8, an iteration of the Flathead Ford V-8, across the Lincoln product line

448
In 1932 Lincoln offered for the first time a 447.9 cubic inch (7.3 L) L-head V-12 with a seven-main bearing crankshaft and 150 hp. The K-Series was previously available only with a developed version (bored out to 384 cubic inches (6.3 L) in 1928 and uprated to 125 hp for 1932) of the 60° V-8 which first saw duty in the 1920 Lincoln L-Series. The expanded engine offering split the K-Series into KA- (powered by the 60° V-8) and KB-Series (powered by the 65° V-12).

382
In 1933 Lincoln introduced a smaller V-12 to replace the ageing V-8 in the KA-Series. Its 67° architecture was a significant departure, with four main bearings, offset blocks, and side-by-side connecting rods rather than fork-and-blade. It produced the same 125 hp specific output as the outgoing V-8 despite a somewhat smaller displacement of 381.7 cubic inches.

414
The KA's 381.7 cubic inch V12 was enlarged for 1934 to replace the 1932-design 448.  This new engine displaced 414 cu. in. (6.8 L) and produced 150 hp (112 kW).  All Lincolns in 1934 (both KA and KB models) were powered by this new 414 V12, and the distinction between models was dropped, with all 1935 Lincolns being simply branded "Model K".  The 414 would last through the end of the Model K's production just before World War II.

References

See also
 List of Ford engines

L-head V12
V12 engines